Anninsky (masculine), Anninskaya (feminine), or Anninskoye (neuter) may refer to:
Anninsky District, a district of Voronezh Oblast, Russia
Anninsky (inhabited locality) (Anninskaya, Anninskoye), several rural localities in Russia